Krasnooktyabrsky (masculine), Krasnooktyabrskaya (feminine), or Krasnooktyabrskoye (neuter) may refer to:
Krasnooktyabrsky District, several districts and city districts in Russia
Krasnooktyabrsky Urban Settlement, a municipal formation which the Urban-Type Settlement of Krasnooktyabrsky in Medvedevsky District of the Mari El Republic, Russia is incorporated as
Krasnooktyabrskoye Urban Settlement, a municipal formation which the work settlement of Krasny Oktyabr in Saratovsky District of Saratov Oblast, Russia is incorporated as
Krasnooktyabrsky, Russia (Krasnooktyabrskaya, Krasnooktyabrskoye), several inhabited localities in Russia
Krasnooktyabrsky, former name of the town of Shopokov in Kyrgyzstan